Terranova da Sibari is a town and comune in the province of Cosenza in the Calabria region of southern Italy. Refugees from the ancient city of Thurii founded Terranova after the destruction of their city in the war against Croton.

Once known as Terranova del Vallo and Terranova di Calabria Citra, it received the current name after the unification of Italy, referring to the ancient cities of Thurii and Sybaris.

The main attractions include the feudal castle, the Torre Acquanova fountain and six medieval-Baroque churches.

International relations

Terranova da Sibari is twinned with:
 Avellaneda, Argentina

Notable people 
Pope Telesphorus (2nd century Pope)
Pope Dionysius (3rd century Pope)

References

External links 

Cities and towns in Calabria
Castles in Italy